Eliza Douglas (born 1984) is a US American painter, performer and photographer who lives and works in New York City and Berlin.

Life 
Douglas grew up in the West Village in New York City. She holds a BA in film studies from Bard College, and attended the Städelschule in Frankfurt-Am-Main from 2015-2017. There she studied with Willem de Rooij. Aside from being an artist Douglas has worked as a model for Balenciaga and Vetements.

Artwork 
Douglas's work is interdisciplinary and ranges from paintings to performance. Her paintings are conceptually driven and combine realism, abstraction, and humor.

Douglas has also collaborated with artist Puppies Puppies and Anne Imhof. She cites Monika Baer and Maria Lassnig as inspirations.

Her work has been exhibited at The Whitney Biennial, Oslo, Museum Folkwang, Essen, Berlin, and the Jewish Museum, New York.

Performance 
Douglas is known for her collaborations with the German artist Anne Imhof.  For the 2021 Carte Blanche at Palais de Tokyo, Douglas wrote and produced the music, did the art direction, casting, styling and performed for Imhof's artwork titled Nature Mortes.  Douglas also co-created the music and performed in Sex, Imhof's 2019 piece for the Tate Modern and Faust, at the 57th Venice Biennale in 2017, which won the Golden Lion . She has performed for Angst I at Kunsthalle Basel in 2016 and Angst II at the Hamburger Bahnhof also in 2016.

Douglas has toured with Antony and the Johnsons (2006) and Devendra Banhart (2004-2006).

Personal life 
Douglas is the great-granddaughter of Dorothy Wolff Douglas, who was a professor of economics and departmental chair at Smith College. Her pieces, Shadow and Light and Blood and Bones are in Dorothy's memory. They were commissioned by and first exhibited at the Jewish Museum, New York  Douglas's partner is Anne Imhof.

Selected solo exhibitions 
 Eliza Douglas, Jewish Museum, New York, 2018
 Old Tissues Filled with Tears, Schinkel Pavillion, Berlin, 2017
 My Gleaming Soul, Museum Folkwang, Essen, 2017
 My Gleaming Soul, Nassauisher Kunstverein, 2017

References 

1984 births
21st-century American painters
Living people
21st-century American women artists
Bard College alumni
Painters from New York City
American women painters